Erik Edlund (14 March 1819 in Närke Province – 19 August 1888 in Stockholm) was a Swedish physicist. His scientific research was confined chiefly to the theory of electricity.  He helped secure the introduction of weather stations to Sweden.

Biography
He obtained his Ph.D. in physics in 1845 at Uppsala University under Svanberg. Edlund then worked under Weber in Leipzig for two years after obtaining his Ph.D.

Edlund was employed as a professor of physics by the Royal Swedish Academy of Sciences in 1850, and became a member of the academy in 1851. In 1858, he became a member of the Royal Society of Sciences in Uppsala, and also of the Royal Swedish Academy of Agriculture; the latter academy made him an honorary member in 1878.

In 1858, Edlund was instrumental in securing the introduction of meteorological stations in Sweden. He conducted these observatories until 1873, when a central meteorological station was erected. The meteorological observations made by Edlund from 1858 to 1873 were published in 14 volumes by the Academy of Sciences.

Edlund is notable as the doctoral advisor of Svante Arrhenius.
In 1872, he was elected to the lower house of the Parliament of Sweden.

Research
Edlund investigated fluid motion, polarization of light during a total eclipse, and thermal phenomena accompanying changes in volume of solids. He studied electricity, describing a method of simultaneously transmitting messages in opposite directions along the same telegraph wire. He investigated the heat given off by induction currents. He studied electromotive forces generated when two different metals are put in contact. He investigated the resistance of arc lamps. He developed a theory of atmospheric electricity to explain the phenomenon of the northern lights. His publications include Theorie des phénomènes électriques (1874).

Notes

References
 Electrician 1888, 21, 595-596.
 La Lumière Électrique 1888, 29, 632-633.
 Leopoldina 1888, 24, 169-170.
 Svenskt Biografiskt Lexikon; Albert Bonniers: 1918-1985; vol. 12, p161-166.
 Humboldt Monatsschr. Gesamt. Naturwiss. 1888, 7, 403.
 Stockh. Vet. Akad. Lefnadsteckn. 1886-94, 5, 281-305.
 Helsingfors. Öfvers. 1889, 31, 247-264.

1819 births
1888 deaths
Swedish physicists
Members of the Royal Swedish Academy of Sciences
Members of the Andra kammaren
Swedish meteorologists